('expanse of the Aryans') is considered in Zoroastrianism to be the homeland of the early Iranians and the place where Zarathustra received the religion from Ahura Mazda. The Avesta also names it as the first of the "sixteen perfect lands" that Ahura Mazda created for the Iranians. 

Based on these descriptions, modern scholarship initially foccused on Airyanem Vaejah in an attempt to determine the homeland of the Iranian peoples in general. Among these early attempts, the region of Khwarezm emerged as a likely locale. More recent scholarship, however, no longer agrees as to where Airyanem Vaejah might have been located or to what extent it is a mythological rather than a specific historical place.

Etymology and related words

The Avestan  and the Middle Persian  are compound terms where the first part is the adjective of Avestan  or genitive plural of Middle Persian , respectively. Both these terms derive from a reconstructed Old Iranian term *āryah. This word also appears in Vedic Sanskrit  as the self designation of the people of the Vedas. Within the context of Iran, however, the term *āryah and its derivatives in other Iranian languages simply mean Iranian. Friedrich Carl Andreas derives it from a hypothetical Old Iranian *vyacah which he connects to Vedic Sanskrit  "territory, region". On the other hand, Émile Benveniste connects it to the Avestan term  (brandish,  throw (a weapon)) which would be cognate to Vedic Sanskrit  (vehement movement, irruption, flow) and, therefore, would give  the meaning of "extent" or "expanse". It may also be related to Vedic Sanskrit  (to move with a quick darting motion, speed, heave (said of waves)), suggesting the region of a fast-flowing river.

Zoroastrian tradition knows at least two other terms that associate the Iranian people with a geographical region. The first is found in the Avesta specifically in the Mihr Yasht. Vers Yt. 10.13 describes how Mithra reaches Mount Hara and overlooks the Airyoshayana ('Iranian lands'). This term is usually interpreted to refer to the entire land inhabited by Iranians which would make it an umbrella term for the Iranian regions mentioned in the following verse Yt. 10.14. However, Gherardo Gnoli notes the ambiguity of the text, such that Airyoshayana, like Airyanem Vaejah, may only refer to a specific country, one that occupies a prominent place among the Iranian countries from verses Yt. 10.13-14. This word is the origin of the modern Persian term Iran. However, a possible Old Iranian origin  has not been established and the term may be an innovation of the Sassanians.

In the Avesta
The earliest mentions of Airyanem Vaejah are found in the Avesta, in particular in the Vendidad and several of the Yashts. In the Yashts, Airyanem Vaejah is most prominently named in the Aban Yasht as the place where both Ahura Mazda and Zarathustra sacrifice to Anahita:

The other verses in which Airyanem Vaejah occurs in the Yashts follow the same structure, differing only in the deity to whom the sacrifice is offered. While in Yt. 5.104, Zarathustra is sacrificing to Anahita, this is changed to Drvaspa in the Drvasp Yasht (Yt. 9.25), and to Ashi in the Ard Yasht (Yt. 17.45). In the Vendidad, however, Airyanem Vaejah appears as the first of the sixteen best lands and countries that Ahura Mazda had created for the Zoroastrian community:

This connection between Airyanem Vaejah and winter is further described in Vd. 2.20-23. In these verses, Ahura Mazda is meeting there with Yima and instructs him to build a shelter for the winter that Angra Mainyu would soon unleash upon the material world. The harsh description of Airyanem Vaejah in Vd. 1.3, however, seems to conflict with the positive assessment given in Vd. 1.1. This has led some to speculate that the third verse is a later insertion, while others think that it could be a fragment of an originally longer description, and the text in Vd. 1.3 refers only to the upper headwaters of the river Daitya.

In Zoroastrian tradition 
In middle Iranian sources, Airyanem Vaejah appears as Eranwez. The Bundahishn describes how Eranwez was the place where the first cattle was created (Bd. 13.4) and where Zarathustra first received the religion from Ahura Mazda (Bd. 35.54). The Bundahishn furthermore states that Eranwez is located near Adarbaygan (Bd. 29.12) and that it is connected by the river Daitya to a country called Gobadestan (Bd. 11A.7). The identity of Gobadestan is not known, but its name has been interpreted as a distortion of Sugdestan.
Likewise, the river Daitya is often identified in the literature with the Oxus. This apparent conflict between a western and an eastern localization in Greater Iran has been explained as a westward shift in geographic place names that may have taken place parallel to the rise of political power in the western regions, in particular Media and Persis.

Modern scholarship

When investigating the historical reality behind Airyanem Vaejah, modern scholarship is faced with the fact that many references appear in a clearly mythical context, while others may point to a specific historical location. Airyanem Vaejah has, therefore, been compared to Mount Hara, a mountain that both appears in Zoroastrian mythology and has been variously identified with real geographical locations. Modern scholarship is thus trying to distinguish between these mythical and historical elements in the Zoroastrian sources and to find out how the early Iranians conceived of their world in each respective context.

Since the Bundahishn (29.12) specifically places Airyanem Vaejah near Adarbaygan, it is clear that during Sassanian times Iranians believed it to be located in Western Iran. Some early modern scholars tended to accept this localisation, assuming that it also reflected the understanding of Iranians at the much earlier time of the Avesta, i.e., the time when the earliest sources were produced. However, this notion has been criticised due to the observation that all place names in the Avesta that can be reliably identified with modern places are found in the eastern and northeastern part of Greater Iran. As a result, more recent scholarship mostly favours an eastern localisation of Airyanem Vaejah.

One hypothesis that has attracted considerable interest identifies Airyanem Vaejah with Khwarezm. It was proposed early on by Wilhelm Geiger and Josef Markwart and a number of arguments have been voiced in its favor over the years. First, Airyanem Vaejah is described as having long and cold winters and Khwarezm is among the coldest regions of Greater Iran. Next, Airyanem Vaejah is described as the original homeland of the Iranians and Khwarezm has been proposed as an early center of Iranian civilization. Another argument builds on a comparison between the list of Iranian countries in the Vendidad (Vd. 1.1.-1.19) and the Mihr Yasht (Yt. 10.13-14). As Christensen has argued, the place occupied by Khwarezm in the Mihr Yasht seems to be occupied by Airyanem Vaejah in the Vendidad. Taken together, these reasons have made the Khwarezm hypothesis very popular and scholars like Mary Boyce, Nasser Takmil Homayoun,  and Elton L. Daniel have endorsed it more recently.

However, this hypothesis has also seen a number of criticisms and counter proposals. For instance, Vogelsang has noted that the notion of Khwarezm as an important center of early Iranian civilization is not substantiated by recent evidence and places Airyanem Vaejah in the general region of Transoxiania. Frantz Grenet has interpreted the cold of  Airyanem Vaejah as referring to a mountainious rather than a northern region and places it in the upper course of the Oxus river at the pre-Pamirian highlands. According to Michael Witzel, however, Airyanem Vaejah lies at the center of the 16 lands mentioned in the Vendidad - an area now in the central Afghan highlands (around Bamyan Province). He also concludes that the idea of finding the "Aryan homeland" in the Avesta should be abandoned and one should rather focus on how both the earlier (Yasht 32.2) and later Avestan texts themselves regarded their own territory. Finally, some scholars like Skjaervo have concluded that the localization of Airyanem Vaejah is insolveable.

See also
 Avestan geography
 Ahura Mazda
 Ariana
 Āryāvarta, its Hindu counterpart
 Indo-Iranians
 Haryana

References

Notes

Citations

Bibliography

External links

 Avesta terminology: Eranvej
 Encyclopedia Iranica: ĒRĀN-WĒZ

Ancient history of Iran
Historiography of Afghanistan
Zoroastrianism
Persian mythology
Indology
Avestan language
Kurdish mythology